Khun Fang is a tambon (sub-district) of Mueang Uttaradit District, in Uttaradit Province, Thailand. In 2015 it had a population of 3,936 people.

History
The sub-district was created 1 July 1983 by splitting off five administrative villages from Pha Chuk.

Administration

Central administration
The tambon is divided into seven administrative villages (muban).

Local administration
The area of the sub-district is covered by the sub-district administrative organization (SAO) Khun Fang (องค์การบริหารส่วนตำบลขุนฝาง).

References

External links
Thaitambon.com on Khun Fang

Tambon of Uttaradit province
Populated places in Uttaradit province